The Slobodan Piva Ivković Award for Lifetime Achievement is an lifetime achievement award honoring the achievements of those basketball coaches who have made a significant contribution to the game of basketball in Serbia. It was first awarded in 1995. The awards are presented by the Serbian Association of Basketball Coaches and its named in honor of coach Slobodan Ivković who was the founder and the first president of the Association. All coaches with Serbian citizenship, regardless of where they coached in the world, qualify for the award. The inaugural Awards for Lifetime Achievement were presented to five recipients: Slobodan Ivković, Borislav Stanković, Ranko Žeravica, Aleksandar Nikolić, and Nebojša Popović. The most recent recipients of the award are Duško Vujošević and Zoran Kovačić.

Recipients

See also 
 List of lifetime achievement awards

References

External links

Awards established in 1995
Basketball awards in Serbia
Lifetime achievement awards
European basketball awards
Serbian sports trophies and awards
1995 establishments in Serbia